Boletinus is a genus of fungi belonging to the family Suillaceae.

The genus was first described by Károly Kalchbrenner in 1867.

The genus has cosmopolitan distribution.

Species:
 Boletinus cavipes Kalchbr.

References

Boletales
Boletales genera